Christopher Stone, an American criminal justice expert, is Professor of Practice of Public Integrity at the Blavatnik School of Government at the University of Oxford.

He was the President of the Open Society Foundations from 2012–2017, the global philanthropies of George Soros. Prior to assuming that position in July 2012, he served as the Guggenheim Professor of the Practice of Criminal Justice at the Harvard Kennedy School from 2005–2012. While at Harvard University, Stone also served as the faculty chair of the Program in Criminal Justice Policy and Management  and as the faculty director of the Hauser Center for Nonprofit Organizations. His work at Harvard included research on justice reform in China and Turkey, the development of performance indicators for the justice sector in developing countries, and research on the establishment of the International Criminal Court.  

Before joining the Harvard Kennedy School faculty, Stone was president and director of the Vera Institute of Justice. There, he served as director of Vera's London office, as the founding director of the Neighborhood Defender Service of Harlem, a nonprofit, community-based public defender in New York City, and as one of three founding directors of the New York State Capital Defender Office.  He also initiated the Institute's work on justice reform in South Africa, Russia, Chile, and China. 

Stone received his AB from Harvard, an MPhil. in criminology from the University of Cambridge, and his JD from the Yale Law School. In 2006 he was awarded an honorary OBE for contributions to criminal justice reform in the United Kingdom.

References

External links 
 Official Open Society Foundations biography of Christopher Stone

Year of birth missing (living people)
Living people
Alumni of the University of Cambridge
American criminologists
Harvard University alumni
Harvard Kennedy School faculty
Yale Law School alumni